South Bluefield Historic District is a national historic district  located at Bluefield, Mercer County, West Virginia.  The district includes 84 contributing buildings in a residential area of Bluefield known as South Bluefield. The buildings are primarily large single family residences with broad lawns, landscaped entrances and yards.  The properties were mostly developed between 1930 and 1940, and are representative of popular architectural styles including Colonial Revival and Classical Revival.  A number of the homes were designed by architect Alex B. Mahood.

It was listed on the National Register of Historic Places in 1992.

References

American Foursquare architecture in West Virginia
Neoclassical architecture in West Virginia
Colonial Revival architecture in West Virginia
National Register of Historic Places in Mercer County, West Virginia
Historic districts in Bluefield, West Virginia
Historic districts on the National Register of Historic Places in West Virginia